Cloone GAA is a Gaelic Athletic Association Gaelic football club in Cloone, County Leitrim, Ireland.

Cloone GAA was founded in 1906. The club amalgamated with Corduff around 1925/26 and with Riverstown around 1931/32.
The club won the Leitrim Senior Football Championship eleven times between 1911 and 1980.

Cloone currently compete in the Leitrim Junior A Football Championship.

Honours

References

 
Gaelic football clubs in County Leitrim